Montesilvano is a city and comune of the province of Pescara in the Abruzzo region of Italy. Abruzzo often called Mare-Monti (Sea-Mountain) region.  The name Montesilvano is apparently derived from the Latin which means "woody hill" ("woods" - silva).

Geography
Montesilvano is located on the Adriatic Sea immediately north of Pescara, to which it is physically connected. It is divided into Montesilvano Marina and Montesilvano Colle. The first is a seaside resort; the second is the original medieval comune and citadel. Montesilvano is a two-hour drive from Rome and is close to Abruzzo Airport and Pescara Centrale railway station. The mouth of the Saline river is directly north of the town.

Administration
The Italian local elections, 2019 saw  Ottavio De Martinis standing for Lega elected as the Mayor of Montesilvano.

Twin towns — sister cities
Montesilvano is twinned with:

 Gradiška, Bosnia and Herzegovina, since 2018
 Hajdúböszörmény, Hungary

Notable people

 Giò Di Tonno, singer
 Dean Martin, singer and movie star whose father was from Montesilvano
 Franco Marini, politician, Montesilvano senator and president of the Italian Senate

References

Cities and towns in Abruzzo